Nellis Prison Camp was a United States federal minimum-security prison, also known as a Federal Prison Camp (FPC), located on Nellis Air Force Base in the state of Nevada. The camp was operational between 1989 and 2006. Notable former inmates include Peter Bacanovic who was convicted along with Martha Stewart of various crimes in the ImClone scandal.

History
The prison opened in 1989 to provide a labor force for the air force base.

After 9/11, security at Nellis was beefed up considerably.  The government did not want federal prisoners and their visitors in such a secure area and
the prison was closed in 2006.

Inmate labor
Inmates participated in a work program on Area II of Nellis AFB. The inmates typically performed janitorial services, groundskeeping, and cleaning of the base bowling alley.

See also
List of U.S. federal prisons
Prisons in the United States

References

External links
  - Federal Bureau of Prisons

Buildings and structures in Clark County, Nevada
Federal Prison Camps
Prisons in Nevada
Residential buildings in the Las Vegas metropolitan area
1989 establishments in Nevada
2006 disestablishments in Nevada